Beinn Bhreac is a twin-peaked Scottish mountain located above Glen Derry in the Cairngorm Mountains  approximately  north-west of Braemar.

Overview 
Beinn Bhreac is a remote mountain located at the southern end of a featureless, boggy moorland plateau called the Moine Bhealaidh (Yellow Moss in Gaelic). The eastern peak is  higher than the western peak. It is commonly approached from the Linn of Dee to the south and is often combined with the neighbouring Munro Beinn a' Chaorainn. From its summit there are extensive views to the surrounding giants of the Cairngorm Mountains including Ben MacDui, Great Britain's second highest mountain.

Geography 
At  Beinn Bhreac is a Munro and is ranked as the 249th highest mountain in Scotland. The mountain has two peaks, the eastern one of which is  higher than the western peak and therefore the summit. The mountain is bounded by Dubh Ghleann to the East and Glen Derry to the West. Both of these sides are steep and rocky in places. Moderately inclined slopes on its south-western side lead down towards Derry Lodge. The boggy moorland plateau called the Moine Bhealaidh extends to the north-west from Beinn Bhreac and links it with the neighbouring peak of Beinn a' Chaorainn. The view from the summit gives a fine panorama and takes in all the Cairngorm giants including Ben MacDui to the west and Beinn a' Bhuird to the east.

Ascent 
The route then goes north up Glen Derry for  before ascending the south-western flanks of Beinn Bhreac. From the bealach between Meall an Lundain and Beinn Bhreac it is a steep climb to the summit.

An approach from the Aviemore side of the Cairngorms is feasible, starting at the Cairn Gorm ski centre, but this involves crossing or bypassing Cairn Gorm, Loch Avon, Beinn Mheadhoin and Beinn a' Chaorainn before reaching the mountain and is a long, hard walk.

References

The Munros, Donald Bennet (Editor) 

Munros
Mountains and hills of the Cairngorms